Guy Lynn is a British TV investigative news reporter for the BBC.

Biography 
Guy Lynn was born in London, attended the Haberdashers' Aske's Boys' School in Elstree and read Geography at St Anne's College, Oxford.

He has reported for a range of TV stations including Channel One TV (London), Reuters TV, BBC South, ITV West, and BBC local radio, and currently reports daily and oversees London investigations at the BBC.

He was a contributing author to Investigative Journalism: Dead or Alive, published in 2011 by Abramis.

Reports 

Lynn's undercover report on fake veterinarian Leonard French, who controlled much of the UK's illegal black market in animal medicine, led directly to the imprisonment of French on 20 August 2007 for twelve months at Lincoln crown court. French's attempt to overturn the sentence was rejected by the court of appeal in 2008.

In August 2009, a TV report exposing discrimination against migrant workers in Boston led to follow-up investigations by the Equality and Human Rights Commission and won "Best Nations and Regions coverage" at the Amnesty International UK Media Awards of 2010.

Amnesty International described it as having received "unprecedented national exposure, making waves from Poland to China. This was outstanding, shocking and emblematic of a deeper malaise in UK society."

In 2012, Ukraine's top Olympic official – the secretary general of the Ukrainian Olympic Committee – Volodymyr Geraschenko, was suspended and later resigned after Lynn's undercover report where Geraschenko offered to illegally sell tickets on the black market prior to the London Olympics.

In 2013, Lynn's BBC report on the underground trade in illegal driving licences led to the UK's Department of Transport announcing a change in the law.

Lynn also travelled to Indonesia where he posed as a coffee importer and uncovered animal cruelty behind a luxury coffee made out of civet cat droppings. Following the programme's broadcast Harrods removed the civet cat coffee from its shelves.

In 2014, his BBC report exposing the discrimination faced by black people in the housing market led to widescale media coverage, protests, demands for an urgent investigation by Labour and won the BBC's Ruby "Best Investigation" award and Circom investigative journalism prize. 

In 2015 and 2016, various reports for the BBC resulted in the lifelong suspension of a large number of high street pharmacists implicated in an investigation about the illegal sales of prescription only medicine leading to the 'biggest crackdown' seen to date against rogue pharmacists in the UK. There were several appeals which were upheld by the UK's High Court of Justice.

In 2019 and 2020, Lynn's reports exposing widescale fraud in the applications to become London mini cab drivers resulted in thousands of applications being suspended and the eventual overhaul of TFL's entire licensing system.

Documentaries

Between 2000 and 2003, Lynn was based in the Middle East, covering the intifada and 11 September for ABC TV news. He wrote and directed the documentary series Ordinary People, broadcast on several TV stations, and co-authored the five-part TV documentary series 100 Years of Terror for Emmy award-winning production company Set Productions.

Awards 

 HIGHLY COMMENDED – Association of International Broadcasting awards 2020 "Best Short TV documentary of the year: 'Cab fraud'" 
 WINNER - BBC Ruby awards 2016 : "Best Exclusive story/investigation of the year"
 HIGHLY COMMENDED – European Prix Circom 2017 "Investigative Journalism": "Fake jobs"
 NOMINEE – BBC Ruby awards 2016 : "Best Exclusive story/investigation of the year"
 NOMINEE – BBC Ruby awards 2016 : "Programme of the year, Inside Out"
 WINNER – BBC Ruby awards 2014 : "Best Exclusive story/investigation of the year"
 WINNER – European Prix Circom 2014 "Investigative Journalism" prize
 NOMINEE – European Diversity Awards 2014 "Journalist of the year 2014"
 WINNER – EDF Media awards 2014 "Television Journalist of the year 2014"
 NOMINEE – Amnesty International Media Awards 2014: Best nations and regions coverage
 HIGHLY COMMENDED – Association of International Broadcasting awards 2014 "Best Short TV documentary": "Racism in housing"
 WINNER –  Guild of Food Writers awards 2014 "Food broadcast of the year" prize
 WINNER – Amnesty International Media Awards 2010 for excellence in human rights reporting
 WINNER – Royal Television Society: RTS Reporter of the Year (2010) (regional)
 WINNER – Royal Television Society: RTS Reporter of the Year (2007) (regional)
 WINNER – Royal Television Society: RTS Reporter of the Year (2006) (regional) 
 HIGHLY COMMENDED- EDF London/South of England Media Awards 2014 "Specialist Journalist of the year 2014"
 NOMINEE – Guild of Food Writers awards 2014 "Campaigning and Investigative journalism" prize 2014
 HIGHLY COMMENDED – EDF London/ South of England Media Awards 2013 "Specialist Journalist of the Year 2013"
  BBC (bronze) Gillard award : Best Original Journalism (2008)
  BBC (bronze) Ruby award: Best Exclusive (2007)
  BBC (bronze) Ruby award: TV News Journalist of the Year (2006)

References

External links 
 Guy Lynn on Twitter
 Guy Lynn blog at BBC College of Journalism on going undercover
 Guy Lynn blog at BBC College of Journalism on giving evidence in court
 BBC undercover investigation on rat meat on sale in London
 Illegal hare coursing, BBC six o clock news 
 Illegal medicines report on BBC Radio 4 
 Original undercover investigation on bogus vet – Leonard French (VT)

Press releases
 BBC Press Release – News report wins major award

British television journalists
BBC newsreaders and journalists
Alumni of St Anne's College, Oxford
Living people
People educated at Haberdashers' Boys' School
Year of birth missing (living people)